"Phantom Limb" is a song by American indie rock band The Shins, and is the fourth track on their third album Wincing the Night Away. The song was also released as the first single from that album in the United States on November 14, 2006 as a digital download and a week later on CD. On January 22, 2007, "Phantom Limb" was released as a single in the United Kingdom. This song was #75 on Rolling Stones list of the 100 Best Songs of 2007.

Songwriter and lead singer James Mercer described it as "a hypothetical, fictional account of a young, lesbian couple in high school dealing with the shitty small town they live in."

Music video
The accompanying music video, directed by Patrick Daughters, includes dramatizations of the stories of Joan of Arc, the Spanish conquest of the Aztec Empire and the Donner Party, all played by children and the band themselves.

Track listing
 "Phantom Limb"  - 4:49
 "Nothing at All"  - 4:07
 "Spilt Needles" (alternate version) - 2:27
 "Phantom Limb" (video)

The vinyl version of this single features "Nothing at All" and "Spilt Needles" on the flipside as two separate grooves, similar to that of Monty Python's Matching Tie and Handkerchief.

Charts
Upon release, the song reached #42 on the UK Singles Chart. In the United States, the song debuted at #86 on Billboard's Hot 100 chart, becoming the first song by the band to chart in the Hot 100. It was also their first song to appear on Billboard's Alternative Songs chart, peaking there at #16.

In media
The chorus of the song has been used repeatedly as background music to episodes of Australian soap opera Home and Away.

Chart performance

References

The Shins songs
2007 singles
Songs written by James Mercer (musician)
Lesbian-related songs
2007 songs
Sub Pop singles